Kingham may refer to:

Places
 Kingham in Oxfordshire, United Kingdom
 Kingham Hill School in Oxfordshire, United Kingdom
 Kingham railway station in Oxfordshire, United Kingdom

People
 Henry Kingham, British footballer
 Jonathan Kingham, American musician
 Tess Kingham, British politician

Other
 HMS Kingham (M2704), a minesweeper of the British Royal Navy
 Lorraine Kingham, a fictional character on the TV show Neighbours